Cuttin' Grass, Vol. 1: The Butcher Shoppe Sessions is the fifth album by American country musician Sturgill Simpson, released on October 16, 2020, through Simpson's own label, High Top Mountain. The album consists of bluegrass renditions of songs from elsewhere in his catalog.

Content
Recorded at the Butcher Shoppe Recording Studio, the album includes various bluegrass musicians such as guitarists Tim O'Brien and Mark Howard, banjoist Scott Vestal, fiddler Stuart Duncan, and mandolinist/backing vocalist Sierra Hull. The album consists of bluegrass re-recordings of previous songs in Simpson's catalog, including not only those from his solo albums, but also those from the band Sunday Valley, of which he was a member prior to beginning his solo career. Simpson had expressed his desire to record a bluegrass album as early as 2017. Both volumes were recorded earlier in 2020 after Simpson had recovered from coronavirus; he and the musicians on record performed a livestreamed concert at the Ryman Auditorium in Nashville on June 5, 2020, as a promise to fans who raised nearly $250,000 for COVID-19 relief.

Critical reception
Stephen M. Deusner of Pitchfork rated the album 7.4 out of 10, stating that "As a country artist, Simpson is determinedly subversive; as a bluegrass artist, he’s incredibly conservative. There are none of the abrupt stylistic changes that made [A Sailor's Guide to Earth] sound as big as the world and none of the sonic experiments that made [Metamodern Sounds in Country Music] such a trip. Simpson can’t quite sustain a double album in this style, and Cuttin' Grass loses some steam toward the end. However, there are more than enough bracing moments here to make you wonder what Volume 2 will sound like". Stephen Thomas Erlewine gave the album 4.5 out of 5 in the review for AllMusic, concluding that "Part of Simpson's appeal lies in how he blurs genres, so it's a bit ironic that this single-minded collection is one of his best records, but it is: it's an album where the joy in the music's creation is palpable and infectious."

Track listing
All songs written by Sturgill Simpson, except “Long White Line” written by Buford Abner.
"All Around You" – 3:09
"All the Pretty Colors" – 2:18
"Breakers Roar" – 2:29
"I Don't Mind" – 4:29
"I Wonder" – 3:14
"Just Let Go" – 3:02
"Life Ain't Fair and the World Is Mean" – 2:00
"A Little Light" – 1:44
"Life of Sin" – 2:17
"Long White Line" – 2:21
"Living the Dream" – 2:30
"Old King Coal" – 2:52
"Railroad of Sin" – 2:12
"Sitting Here Without You" – 1:55
"Sometimes Wine" – 3:55
"The Storm" – 2:31
"Time After All" – 2:14
"Turtles All the Way Down" – 2:18
"Voices" – 3:37
"Water in a Well" – 3:46

Personnel
Per Bandcamp.

Musical
 Mike Bub – upright bass
 Stuart Duncan – fiddle, background vocals
 Mark Howard – background vocals, lead guitar, rhythm guitar
 Sierra Hull – mandolin, background vocals
 Miles Miller – percussion, background vocals
 Tim O'Brien – background vocals, lead guitar, rhythm guitar
 Sturgill Simpson – vocals, rhythm guitar
 Scott Vestal – banjo, background vocals

Technical
 Richard Dodd – mastering
 David Ferguson – producer, engineer, mixer
 Sturgill Simpson – producer
 Sean Sullivan – engineer, mixer

Charts

Weekly charts

Year-end charts

References

2020 albums
Thirty Tigers albums
Sturgill Simpson albums